This is a chart of cultural periods of Peru and the Andean Region developed by John Rowe and Edward Lanning and used by some archaeologists studying the area. An alternative dating system was developed by Luis Lumbreras and provides different dates for some archaeological finds.

Most of the cultures of the Late Horizon and some of the cultures of the Late Intermediate joined the Inca Empire by 1493, but the period ends in 1532 because that marks the fall of the Inca Empire after the Spanish conquest. Most of the cut-off years mark either an end of a severe drought or the beginning of one. These marked a shift of the most productive farming to or from the mountains, and tended to mark the end of one culture and the rise of another.

The more recent findings concerning the Norte Chico civilization are not included on this list, as it was compiled before the site at Caral was investigated in detail.

{| class="wikitable"
|-
!Period
!Dates
!Cultures
|- align="center" bgcolor="#CCCCCC"
!colspan="3" |Lithic and Andean preceramic
|-
| Period I
|12000 BCE – 9500 BCE
| Red Zone (12000 BCE – 10500 BCE),Oquendo (10500 BCE – 9500 BCE)
|-
|Period II
|9500 BCE – 8000 BCE
| Chivateros I
|-
| Period III
|8000 BCE – 6000 BCE
| Arenal, Chivateros II, Lauricocha I, Playa Chira, Puyenca, Toquepala I
|-
| Period IV
|6000 BCE – 4200 BCE
| Ambo, Canario, Siches, Lauricocha II, Luz, Toquepala II
|-
| Period V
|4200 BCE – 2500 BCE
| Honda, Lauricocha III, Pernil Alto, Sechin Bajo, Viscachani
|-
| Period VI (Cotton Pre-ceramic)
|2500 BCE – 1800 BCE
| Norte Chico (Caral), Buena Vista, Casavilca, Culebras, Ventarron, Viscachani, Huaca Prieta, Las Haldas
|- align="center" bgcolor="#CCCCCC"
!colspan="3" |Ceramic
|-
| Initial Period (also called Formative Period)
|1800 BCE – 900 BCE
| Early Chiripa, Kotosh culture, Cupisnique, Toríl (The Cumbe Mayo aqueduct was built ), Las Haldas, Pucará, Casma–Sechin .  
|-
| Early Horizon (Also called Formative Period)
|900 BCE – 200 BCE
| Chavín, Late Chiripa, Paracas, Pechiche, Pucará, Sechura, Casma–Sechin 
|-
| Early Intermediate  200 BCE –  600 CE
| , Nazca, Recuay, Lima, Tiwanaku, Pechiche, Piura, Salinar, Vicus, Huarpa, Virú
|-
| Middle Horizon
| 600 CE – 1000 CE
| Wari, Tiwanaku, Piura, Las Ánimas, Sican
|-
| Late Intermediate
|1000 CE – 1476 CE
| Chimú, Cajamarca, Piura, Chancay, Chachapoya, Chincha, Chiribaya, Chucuito, Huaman Huilca, Ilo, Qotu Qotu, Pacacocha, Palli Marca, Piura, Sican, Tajaraca, Huaylas, Conchucos, Huamachuco, Rucanas, Chanka, Wanka, Aymara kingdoms (Qulla, Lupaca, Charca, Kana, Qanchi), Ayabaca, Bracamoros, Huancabambas, Tallán, Tumpis, Huarco, Coayllo, Ichma, Parinacota, Cuntis, Chinchaycochas, Huarochiri, Kheswas, Yaro, Atavillo, Cantas, Yauyos, Tarmas, Paltas, Camanas (peruvian culture), Huayuri
|-
|Late Horizon
|1476 CE – 1534 CE
| Inca
|}

See also
Ancient Peru
Amazonas before the Inca Empire
The Pre-Incan Lost Pyramid of Puñay

References
Edward P. Lanning, 1967 Peru Before the Incas. Prentice Hall, Englewood Cliffs, N.J., 

Peru
Andean civilizations
History of indigenous peoples of South America
Archaeology of Peru
Pre-Columbian cultures
Periodization
Peru history-related lists